Angela Lynn Rasmussen is an American virologist at the Vaccine and Infectious Disease Organization at the University of Saskatchewan in Canada.

Education and early career 
During graduate school, Rasmussen worked in the laboratory of Vincent Racaniello where she developed a mouse model of rhinovirus infection in order to better understand the pathogenesis of illnesses caused by the virus, such as the common cold.

Research 
Rasmussen joined the faculty at Columbia University Mailman School of Public Health, where she worked as an associate research scientist. There, she studied how hosts respond to infectious diseases like SARS and Ebola.

Ebolavirus research 
During her tenure at University of Washington, she studied the response of mice to ebolavirus infection. The traditional mouse model, which is derived from a uniform genetic background, dies after being infected with the virus before the classical symptoms of the disease show up, making it difficult to study the pathogenesis of the virus. Instead, Rasmussen and her team took advantage of a genetically diverse collection of mice, known as the Collaborative Cross; when infecting this collection of mice with ebolavirus, they observed a wide range of disease outcomes, ranging from complete resistance to the virus to severe hemorrhagic fever. They concluded that the genetic background of the mice therefore plays a role in their susceptibility to the virus. By understanding which genes in mice affect the course of infection, they can better determine which genes make humans more susceptible to the disease—and why some humans die, while others survive.

Rasmussen continued work on understanding genetic susceptibility with Ebola at Columbia University. There, she identified a gene expression signature that may predict the severity of Ebola infection. Rasmussen and collaborators have also used human cell lines to investigate the course of infection. Upon infection, ebolavirus first targets macrophages, or white blood cells that engulf and clear away pathogens, which in turn release inflammatory cytokines that recruit more immune cells to the site of the infection to kill off infected tissue. If cytokine release goes unchecked it can lead to a profound inflammatory response—known as a cytokine storm—that can kill off healthy tissue, as is the case with an ebolavirus infection. She and collaborators found that inhibiting the inflammatory response of virus-infected macrophages could be a potential therapeutic target, preventing a cytokine storm from occurring.

COVID-19 work 
Rasmussen's work investigating the heterogeneity in Ebola infections has translated into developing hypotheses around why some COVID-19 cases are worse than others.

She has also been on the frontlines of communication around the novel coronavirus and COVID-19, applying her expertise in correspondence with the popular press to interpret preliminary results around how long immunity to the virus may last, how effective potential drugs may be in treating the disease, and whether biological sex plays a role in the severity of the disease. Given the breakneck pace at which preliminary research results have been released—for example, through preprints—she has urged caution in reporting research findings too quickly and without the proper caveats to ensure the public is not misinformed.

Advocacy 
Rasmussen has served on a National Institutes of Health working group on "Changing the Culture to End Sexual Harassment" in biomedical research fields. She formerly served on the leadership of the organization MeTooSTEM, before stepping down in February 2020 due to concerns around the organization's leadership and allegations of abuse.

References

External links 

Columbia University alumni
Smith College alumni
Columbia University faculty
American virologists
Ebola researchers
COVID-19 researchers
1970s births
Living people
Women virologists
21st-century American scientists
21st-century American women scientists
American women academics
Jeopardy! contestants